Steve Payne may refer to:

Steve Payne (footballer) (born 1975), English footballer
Steve Payne (ice hockey) (born 1958), ice hockey left winger
Steve Payne (basketball) (born 1968), American college basketball coach

See also
Stephen Payne (disambiguation)